Li Yuan (born 1879) was a politician of the Republic of China and later Manchukuo.

Background
He was born in Beijing. A loyalist of Fengtian clique warlord Zhang Zuolin, he became the 12th Republican mayor of his hometown on September 4, 1926. He had been acting mayor since May. In February 1933, Li travelled to Chita, Zabaykalsky Krai in the Soviet Union to be consulate general on behalf of the government of Manchukuo.

Disappearance
In November 1935, Li and Yin Ju-keng created the East Hebei Autonomous Council. The circumstances of his later life and death are unknown.

See also 
List of people who disappeared

References

Bibliography
 
 
 
 尾崎秀実監修「アジア人名辞典」

1879 births
20th-century deaths
1930s missing person cases
Missing person cases in China
Year of death unknown
People of Manchukuo
Republic of China mayors of Beiping